Robert Thompson Ebersohn (born 23 February 1989) is a rugby union and Sevens professional player from South Africa. He has played for the Springboks Sevens, South Africa Under 20 and made his Super 14 debut for the Cheetahs in 2010. When participating in the 15-man format of rugby, his preferred position is centre although he has been employed as a fullback on various occasions.

Ebersohn has made over 100 appearances for the Cheetahs in all competitions. He has one caps for the boks. However, it was announced that he would leave Bloemfontein at the end of the 2013 Currie Cup Premier Division season and join French side Montpellier for the 2013–14 Top 14 season.

Ebersohn Twins
The Ebersohn twins (Robert and Sias) are the sons of Tiaan Ebersohn, a center who played for the Free State and Western Province. The twins were born and raised in Bloemfontein, South Africa and schooled at Grey College. Here they climbed the ranks and eventually presented the Free State schools team at the national Coca-Cola Craven Week. Fame came fast as they were chosen to present South Africa at the IRB Junior World Championship. Both players were quickly grabbed into the Free State Cheetahs rugby squad.
They played side-by-side from school level to Super Rugby level until Sias joined Australian side the Western Force in 2013 and Robert joined Montpellier a few months later.

Religion
Robert is a devoted Christian.

Squads
Robert Ebersohn was involved in the following squads:
2013
Toyota Free State Cheetahs (Currie Cup)
Cheetahs (Super Rugby)
Springboks (2013 mid-year rugby union tests)
2012
Toyota Free State Cheetahs (Currie Cup) – Captain
Cheetahs (Super Rugby)
2011
Toyota Free State Cheetahs (Currie Cup)
Cheetahs (Super Rugby)
Springbok Sevens (IRB Sevens World Series)
2010
Vodacom Free State Cheetahs (Currie Cup)
Cheetahs (Super Rugby)
Vodacom Free State Cheetahs (Vodacom Cup)
2009
Vodacom Free State Cheetahs (Currie Cup)
South Africa (IRB Junior World Championship) – Captain
Springbok Sevens (Rugby World Cup Sevens)
Springbok Sevens (IRB Sevens World Series)
2008
Springbok Sevens (IRB Sevens World Series)
South Africa (IRB Junior World Championship)
Vodacom Free State Cheetahs (Currie Cup)
Vodacom Free State Cheetahs (Vodacom Cup)
Shimlas (FNB Varsity Cup)
2007
Free State U/19 (ABSA U/19 Competition)
SA Schools (SA Schools)
Free State (U18 Coca-Cola Craven Week)
2006
Free State (U18 Coca-Cola Craven Week)
2005
Free State (U16 Coca-Cola Grant Khomo Week)

Honours
 2015–16 European Rugby Challenge Cup : winner.

References

External links
Cheetahs Profile

Scrum.com Profile

South African rugby union players
South African Christians
1989 births
Sportspeople from Bloemfontein
Living people
Cheetahs (rugby union) players
Free State Cheetahs players
Alumni of Grey College, Bloemfontein
South African twins
Twin sportspeople
South Africa international rugby sevens players
South Africa Under-20 international rugby union players
Montpellier Hérault Rugby players
Castres Olympique players
AS Béziers Hérault players